The Indian chameleon (Chamaeleo zeylanicus) is a species of chameleon found in Sri Lanka, India, and other parts of South Asia. Like other chameleons, this species has a long tongue, feet that are shaped into bifid claspers, a prehensile tail, independent eye movement, and the ability to change skin colour. They move slowly with a bobbing or swaying movement and are usually arboreal. Strangely, they do not choose the background colour and may not even be able to perceive colour differences. They are usually in shades of green or brown or with bands. They can change colour rapidly and the primary purpose of colour change is for communication with other chameleons and for controlling body temperature by changing to dark colours to absorb heat.

Distribution

They are found throughout much of India south of the Ganges River, southeasternmost Pakistan, and parts of Sri Lanka. This makes them widely geographically separated from all other chameleons, which inhabit Africa, the Indian Ocean islands near Africa, southern Europe, and the Arabian Peninsula. Phylogenetic evidence suggests that this unusual distribution is the consequence of oceanic dispersal to India from Arabia during the mid-Miocene.

The type locality is Sri Lanka, restricted by Mertens in 1969.

Description
The head has a bony casque, ornamented with crests or tubercles. A separation between the eyes, the interorbital septum, is present.  Its dentition is acrodont; the teeth are compressed, triangular, and more or less distinctly tricuspid. The palate is toothless. The eyes are large, covered by a thick, granular lids pierced with a small central opening for the pupil. No tympanum or external ear is present. The body is compressed, and the neck is very short. The vertebrae are procoelian; abdominal ribs are present. The limbs are long, raising the body. The digits are arranged in bundles of two and three; in the hand, the inner bundle is formed of three, the outer of two digits; it is the reverse in the foot. The tail is prehensile. The head and body are covered with granules or tubercles.

The casque is much elevated posteriorly, with a strong curved parietal crest; the distance between the commissure of the mouth and the extremity of the casque equals or nearly equals the distance between the end of the snout and the hinder extremity of the mandible; no rostral appendages occur; a strong lateral crest, not reaching the end of the parietal crest, is present; an indication of a dermal occipital lobe is found on each side, not reaching the parietal crest. No enlarged tubercles occur on the body; a feebly serrated dorsal crest is present; a series of conical tubercles form a very distinct crest along the throat and belly. Males have a tarsal process or spur, the tail is longer than head and body. The gular-ventral crest and the commissure of the mouth are white.

From snout to vent, it is up to 7 in long, with a prehensile tail of 8 in.

Notes

References
 Barry, A.T. 1936 The Common Chamaeleon (Chamaeleon zeylanicus) in Gujarat J. Bombay Nat. Hist. Soc. 38: 201-202
 Gray, J. E. 1865 Revision of the genera and species of Chamaeleonidae, with the description of some new species. Proc. zool. Soc. London, 1864: 465-479.
 Laurenti, J. N. 1768 Specimen medicum, exhibens synopsin reptilium emendatam cum experimentis circa venena et antidota reptilium austracorum, quod authoritate et consensu. Vienna, Joan. Thomae, 217 pp.
 Singh, L. A. K. (1979): To change is chameleon.  Science Reporter, 16 (1) : 59-61.
 Singh, L. A. K., Acharjyo, L. N., Bustard, H. R. (1984) : Observation on the reproductive biology of the Indian chameleon, Chamaeleo zeylanicus (Laurenti).  J.Bombay nat. Hist. Soc., 81(1) : 86-92.
 Singh, L. A. K. (1986): The Indian chameleon, Chamaeleo zeylanicus (Laurenti) in Satkoshia Gorge Sanctuary, Orissa : Notes on availability, growth and biometrics. J.Bombay nat.Hist. Soc., 83(1), 111-119.

External links

 
 Sri Lankan Reptiles @ The University of Peradeniya Department of Zoology

Reptiles of India
Reptiles of Sri Lanka
Reptiles of Pakistan
Chamaeleo
Fauna of South Asia
Reptiles described in 1768
Taxa named by Josephus Nicolaus Laurenti